Meredith Scott Lynn (born March 8, 1970) is an American actress, producer, and director, best known as Anne in ‘’Days of Our Lives’’ (2012–2017).

Early life 
Lynn's mother is a former teacher.
Lynn attended the High School of Performing Arts in New York City.

Career 
In the 1980s, Lynn's entertainment career began with appearances in the final two episodes of The Facts of Life.
Lynn has over 60 film and television credits.

Lynn became the founder and CEO of WRiTE BRAiN BOOKS.

Filmography

Television

Producer
 Designing Blind (2006) TV series (executive producer) (unknown episodes)
 Standing on Fishes (1999) (producer)
 Demo Reel: A Tragedy in 10 Minutes (1999) (producer)
 Billy's Hollywood Screen Kiss (1998) (co-producer)
 I Love You, Don't Touch Me! (1997) (co-producer)

Director
 Standing on Fishes (1999)

Personal life
Lynn is Jewish.

References

External links

American film actresses
20th-century American Jews
American television actresses
Living people
People from Brooklyn
1970 births
20th-century American actresses
21st-century American actresses
Fiorello H. LaGuardia High School alumni
Actresses from New York City
21st-century American Jews